The Ducati Vento is a  single cylinder bevel drive SOHC motorcycle produced by the Spanish manufacturer MotoTrans, who were licensed by Ducati to produce motorcycles under the Ducati brand name and was produced from 1978 to 1983. The model is based on the 350 'wide case' Ducati singles which the Italian Ducati factory had stopped manufacturing in 1974, but which MotoTrans continued to develop and produce. The machine had café racer styling and was intended to be a successor to the earlier 24 Horas.

Model history
A prototype was shown at the 1974 Automobile Barcelona Show alongside the touring Forza. The prototype had a single front disc brake and wire wheels.

A second prototype was later shown with twin front discs and cast wheels.

The machine went into production in 1976 with a redesigned frame. A racing seat, clip-ons and rearsets were fitted. To save weight, the electric starter used on the Forza was not fitted. Most of the machines were finished in green, but some later machines were finished in red. They were sold mainly in the Spanish Market.

Production was suspended in late 1981 due to MotoTrans being in financial trouble, but resumed in the Summer of 1982. The next year, 1983, production stopped when the company went into receivership.

Technical details

Engine and transmission
The single cylinder bevel drive OHC engine was of unit construction and had an alloy head and alloy barrel with cast iron liners. A 10:1 piston was fitted.

Fuel was delivered by a 32mm Dell'Orto PHF carburettor. The engine used wet sump lubrication and ignition was by battery and coil.

Primary drive was by gears to a multi-plate wet clutch and 5 speed gearbox. Chain drive took power to the rear wheel.

Cycle parts
A single cradle frame was used. Rear suspension was by swinging arm with twin adjustable Telesco Hydrobag gas shock absorbers. At the front Telesco telescopic forks were fitted. Twin Brembo  diameter disc brakes were fitted on the front and a single Brembo disc of the same size on the rear.

Michelin sports tyres were fitted, 325x18 front and 350x18 rear, on six spoke cast alloy wheels.

References

Bibliography

External links

 Ducati Vento Owners Manual
 

Ducati motorcycles
Motorcycles introduced in 1976
Single-cylinder motorcycles
Sport bikes